Wayne Alton Wells (born September 29, 1946) is an American wrestler and Olympic champion in freestyle wrestling at the 1972 Olympic Games. Wells was born in Abilene, Texas and grew up in Oklahoma.

Wrestling career
While wrestling at the University of Oklahoma, Wayne was a three-time Big Eight champion and a three-time All-American. He was an NCAA runner-up as a junior, he won the NCAA national championship the following year as a senior. 

Wells placed fourth at the 1968 Olympic Games. While turning his attention to law school and the foundation of his professional career, Wayne intensified his wrestling efforts. He captured the silver medal at the 1969 World Championships, then returned a year later to win gold at the 1970 World Championships. He won two national freestyle titles and placed second in the Pan American Games. In the months leading up to the 1972 Olympics, he completed his final year of law school, passed the state bar exam, assisted the OU coaching staff, and trained five hours a day. At the 1972 Olympic Games in Munich, he earned a gold medal in freestyle wrestling in the welterweight class. Wells is also noted for being the first ever Nike signature athlete.

In 1982, Wells was inducted into the National Wrestling Hall of Fame as a Distinguished Member.

References

External links

1946 births
Living people
Wrestlers at the 1968 Summer Olympics
Wrestlers at the 1972 Summer Olympics
American male sport wrestlers
Olympic gold medalists for the United States in wrestling
Oklahoma Sooners wrestlers
Medalists at the 1972 Summer Olympics
Pan American Games medalists in wrestling
Pan American Games silver medalists for the United States
Wrestlers at the 1971 Pan American Games
Medalists at the 1971 Pan American Games